Pablo Sebastián Garnier (born 26 February 1981 in San Salvador de Jujuy, Jujuy Province) is an Argentine footballer, who plays as a right winger.

Club career
Garnier started his career with Gimnasia y Esgrima de Jujuy in the Argentine 2nd Division. In 2003, he moved to Quilmes Atlético Club in the Primera Division.

Between 2004 and 2006 Garnier played for Club Libertad in Paraguay before returning to Argentina to play for Arsenal de Sarandí. In 2008, he transferred to Colón de Santa Fe where he played until June 2009; subsequently he signed with club Defensa y Justicia of the Argentine second division.

Titles

External links
 Argentine Primera statistics
Statistics at Irish Times
Pablo Garnier at Football Lineups

1981 births
Living people
Sportspeople from Jujuy Province
Argentine footballers
Association football midfielders
Gimnasia y Esgrima de Jujuy footballers
Quilmes Atlético Club footballers
Arsenal de Sarandí footballers
Club Atlético Colón footballers
Defensa y Justicia footballers
Club Libertad footballers
Atlético Tucumán footballers
Altos Hornos Zapla players
Juventud Antoniana footballers
Argentine Primera División players
Primera Nacional players
Torneo Federal A players
Argentine expatriate footballers
Argentine expatriate sportspeople in Paraguay
Argentine expatriate sportspeople in Bolivia
Expatriate footballers in Paraguay
Expatriate footballers in Bolivia
Argentine people of French descent